Shane Bowers may refer to:

Shane Bowers (baseball) (born 1971), American baseball player
Shane Bowers (ice hockey) (born 1999), Canadian ice hockey player